Iman Jamali Moorchegani (born 11 October 1991) is an Iranian-born Hungarian handball player who plays for Ceglédi KKSE and the Hungarian national team.

He represented Hungary at the 2019 World Men's Handball Championship.

References

Iranian male handball players
Hungarian male handball players
Living people
1991 births
Veszprém KC players
IFK Kristianstad players
CS Dinamo București (men's handball) players
Sportspeople from Isfahan
Expatriate handball players
Hungarian people of Iranian descent
Sportspeople of Iranian descent
Iranian emigrants to Hungary
Iranian expatriate sportspeople in Sweden
Iranian expatriates in Romania